Brian Alexander Herbinson (25 November 1930 – 30 August 2022) was a member of the Canadian Equestrian Team. He was born in Ballymena.  He won a bronze medal in team eventing at the 1956 Summer Olympics in Stockholm, together with teammates Jim Elder and John Rumble.  He placed 20th in individual eventing at the same games.

References

External links

1930 births
2022 deaths
Sportspeople from Ballymena
Canadian male equestrians
Olympic bronze medalists for Canada
Equestrians at the 1956 Summer Olympics
Equestrians at the 1960 Summer Olympics
Olympic medalists in equestrian
Medalists at the 1956 Summer Olympics
Pan American Games medalists in equestrian
Pan American Games gold medalists for Canada
Equestrians at the 1959 Pan American Games
Medalists at the 1959 Pan American Games
20th-century Canadian people
21st-century Canadian people